Senator Tod may refer to:

David Tod (1805–1868), Ohio State Senate
George Tod (judge) (1773–1841), Ohio State Senate
John Tod (1779–1830), Pennsylvania State Senate

See also
Senator Todd (disambiguation)